The Asia/Oceania Zone is one of the three zones of regional Davis Cup competition in 2012.

In the Asia/Oceania Zone there are four different groups in which teams compete against each other to advance to the next group.

Participating nations

Seeds:
 
  (second round)
 
  (second round)

Remaining Nations:

Draw

 and  relegated to Group III in 2013.
 promoted to Group I in 2013.

First round

Philippines vs. Pacific Oceania

Lebanon vs. Pakistan

Hong Kong vs. Indonesia

Sri Lanka vs. Thailand

Second round

Philippines vs. Pakistan

Indonesia vs. Thailand

Play-offs

Lebanon vs. Pacific Oceania

Hong Kong vs. Sri Lanka

Third round

Philippines vs. Indonesia

References

External links
Official Website

Asia Oceania Zone II
Davis Cup Asia/Oceania Zone